The Man Who Watched Trains Go By (1952) is a crime drama film, based on the 1938 novel by Georges Simenon and directed by Harold French. It has an all-European cast, including Claude Rains in the lead role of Kees Popinga, who is infatuated with Michele Rozier (Märta Torén). The film was released in the United States in 1953 under the title The Paris Express.

Plot
In the Dutch city of Groningen, Kees Popinga (Claude Rains) has worked for 18 years as chief clerk and bookkeeper for a 300-year-old trading company, now run by Julius de Koster Jr. (Herbert Lom).  Kees's life is comfortable but stodgy; he loves trains but has never traveled farther than Amsterdam.

One day a man named Merkemans (Felix Aylmer), who had managed a company that went bankrupt due to another man's embezzlement, pleads with de Koster for a job. De Koster refuses because his own firm has too impeccable a reputation to be connected with such a scandal, and Merkemans had had the responsibility to prevent the fraud. Then a French police inspector named Lucas (Marius Goring) arrives to talk to de Koster about Dutch money that is turning up illegally in Paris; Lucas suspects the de Koster company, but de Koster invites Kees to show him that the books are sound. That night, Kees happens to see de Koster kissing a woman (Märta Torén) goodbye at a station.

Later, Lucas questions Kees and de Koster about the woman, showing a picture. De Koster lies; Kees supports him, but now fears that he too has failed to prevent a crime. That night his fears are confirmed when he goes to the office and finds de Koster burning the books. De Koster says the firm will be bankrupt in the morning. Kees follows de Koster to a canal. De Koster shows him a suicide note. Kees is trying to stop him jumping in the water when De Koster's briefcase comes open, revealing 100,000 Dutch guilders in cash. The suicide note was a fake. Enraged, Kees attacks de Koster, who falls into the water and hits his head on a boat.

Also in the briefcase is a train ticket to Paris and the address of the woman, whose name is Michele Rozier. Kees takes the briefcase and boards the train, abandoning his family. On board he is surprised to meet Lucas, who makes it clear he suspects Kees. As they approach Paris, Kees jumps off the train. He goes to Michele, but she turns him away, not realizing he has the money. Lucas meets her and explains what has happened. He says de Koster is alive, but Kees does not know this, and Lucas fears he will now do something desperate.

As Lucas hopes, Michele wants the money enough to trace Kees, and the police follow her to him. But she helps him get away and stay with Louis (Ferdy Mayne), her lover, who lives over a garage near train tracks. She tells Kees that within a couple of days Louis will provide Kees with fake papers so he can leave the country.

Kees is suspicious enough to hide the money, in an abandoned car near the tracks, before Louis is able to search his effects. Bored with hiding out and tired of belittling remarks about his status, he decides to "live dangerously" and takes Michele out on the town. She seems to warm to him and he is seduced into trusting her. Drunk and infatuated, he phones Lucas to taunt him, promises Michele they will go away together, and then tells her where the money is. She goes there, but Lucas has already found it. He offers her immunity if she helps him find Kees.

Kees gets away from Lucas, steals a knife from a shop window, and goes to the garage.  At knifepoint, Louis phones Michele and asks her to come.  Kees confronts Michele and threatens to prove his worth by killing her—and then he does.  With Lucas in pursuit, he runs onto the train tracks and directly toward an approaching train.  At the last moment it reaches a switch and crosses onto another track.  Kees rambles deliriously as Lucas arrests him.

Cast
Claude Rains as Kees Popinga
Marius Goring as Lucas
Märta Torén as Michele Rozier
Ferdy Mayne as Louis
Herbert Lom as Julius de Koster Jr
Lucie Mannheim as Maria Popinga
Anouk Aimée as Jeanne
Eric Pohlmann as Goin
Felix Aylmer as Mr Merkemans
Gibb McLaughlin as Julius de Koster Sr
Michael Nightingale as Popinga's Clerk

Critical reception
TV Guide wrote that the film "boasts good performances from Rains, Toren, and Lom, but is hampered by the static direction of Harold French"; whereas Culture Catch called it a "solid adaptation," which "embraces Simenon's favorite archetype, an innocent who mistakenly thinks he has committed some evil act, and then eventually actually does...Directed by Harold French, a British stalwart, this little thriller is worth every one of the 82 minutes you'll spend with it."

References

External links
 

1952 films
1952 crime drama films
British crime drama films
Films directed by Harold French
Films based on Belgian novels
Films based on works by Georges Simenon
Rail transport films
Films scored by Benjamin Frankel
Films set in the Netherlands
Films set in France
Films set in Paris
Films shot at Nettlefold Studios
1950s English-language films
1950s British films